Jon Garrett (born May 8, 1970) is an American professional stock car racing driver. He competes full-time in the ARCA Menards Series, driving the No. 66 Chevrolet for Veer Motorsports.

Racing career

ARCA Menards Series
Garrett made his ARCA Menards Series debut in 2022 in the General Tire 200 at Talladega Superspeedway.

Motorsports career results

ARCA Menards Series

ARCA Menards Series East

ARCA Menards Series West

References

External links 

Living people
ARCA Menards Series drivers
NASCAR drivers
Racing drivers from Texas
1970 births